Warsaw High School, or WHS, is a public four-year high school located in Warsaw, Illinois, a small city in Hancock County in the Midwestern United States. WHS serves the communities of Warsaw, Basco, Colusa, Nauvoo, Niota, Sutter and Tioga.

History

Warsaw High School consolidated with Nauvoo-Colusa High School in 2008–2009, which itself existed as a separate high school from 1961 to 2008. Surrounding communities may have also possessed high schools at some time which were consolidated into the current WHS.

Academics

Athletics
Warsaw High School competes in the West Central Conference and is a member school in the Illinois High School Association. Due to its small enrollment, WHS co-operates with nearby Hamilton High School for most athletics under the mascot of the Titans and the colors of red, white and black. The school has two state championships on record in team athletics and activities: boys' basketball in 1996-1997 (A) and girls' basketball in 2007-2008 (2A).

References

External links
 Warsaw High School
 

Public high schools in Illinois
Schools in Hancock County, Illinois